Perfection is an EP by Sandra Bernhard, released in 2008. The original full version of the song appears on her 2007 live album "Everything Bad & Beautiful".

Track listing

 "Perfection (Eve's Radio Edit)" – 2:58
 "Perfection (Lunic's Minimal Dub)" – 8:34
 "Perfection (Balo & Trakkula's Dub)" – 9:15
 "Perfection (Balo & Trakkula's Dance Dub)" – 5:44
 "Perfection (Balo & Trakkula's Hard Dub)" – 5:28
 "Perfection (Balo & Trakkula's Club Dub)" – 8:44

Description

Original Release Date: September 9, 2008, on Breaking Records. The original track appears on the 2007 Enhanced CD Everything Bad & Beautiful produced by Eve Nelson and the mixes were courtesy of Executive Producer William Daniels of Bug Music. The EP Featured 5 remixes from DJ's like DJ Lunic and DJ Louie Balo and Trakkula.

Reviews

Larry Flick, Host of Out Q In the Morning with Larry Flick said, "A slammin' blend of banging beats and Sandra's astute view of pop culture. Equally nutritious to the brain and booty."

All Music Guide, "Perfection, a strange club track best suited for sardonic dance floors."

References

 :Label official website
 : AMAZON

External links
 :Label official website
 : AMAZON
 : Producer Eve Nelson Official website

Sandra Bernhard albums
2008 EPs